Zurab Zhvania (born 23 September 1991 in Georgia) is a Georgian rugby union player. He plays prop or hooker for Georgia on international level.

On the 9 March 2013 Zhvania made his debut for Georgia against Spain in the European Nations Cup.

Career statistics
.

References

External links
itsrugby.co.uk profile

1991 births
Living people
Rugby union players from Georgia (country)
Rugby union props
Expatriate rugby union players from Georgia (country)
Expatriate rugby union players in France
Expatriate sportspeople from Georgia (country) in France